San Cristóbal is a barrio or neighbourhood of the Argentine capital, Buenos Aires.

The Subte Line E goes under the San Juan Avenue.

External links 

San Cristóbal web (Spanish)

Neighbourhoods of Buenos Aires